Fast ferries or fast ferry may refer to:

Vessels
High-speed craft, a high-speed water vessel also called a fast ferry
List of HSC ferry routes
Passenger-Only Fast Ferry-class ferry, ferries propelled by water jets rather than traditional propellers
MDV 1200-class fast ferry, a class of six vessels built by Fincantieri in Italy

Businesses
Fast Ferries (Greece), a Greek ferry operator
Supercat Fast Ferry Corporation, a Philippines high-speed catamaran operator
Kitsap Fast Ferries, an American passenger ferry service
Ocean Fast Ferries, a Philippines high-speed craft operator
Sydney Fast Ferries, an Australian high-speed ferry operator

Other uses
Fast Ferry Scandal, a political affair in the late 1990s in British Columbia, Canada
PacifiCat-class ferry, defunct fast ferries

See also
FastCat (disambiguation)
Auto Express 86-class ferry, a class of high-speed catamarans by Austal Ships of Australia
SpeedFerries, a British ferry operator 2004–2008